The 29th New York Infantry Regiment, the "Astor Rifles" or "1st German Infantry", was an infantry regiment that served in the Union Army during the American Civil War.

Service
The regiment was organized in New York City, New York,  and was mustered in for a two-year enlistment on June 6, 1861.

The regiment was mustered out of service on June 20, 1863, and those men who had signed three year enlistments or who re-enlisted were mustered as the Independent Compy, 29th New York Infantry until they were transferred to the 68th New York on April 19, 1864.

Total strength and casualties
The regiment suffered 8 officers and 107 enlisted men who were killed in action or mortally wounded and 1 officer and 158 enlisted men who died of disease, for a total of 274 fatalities.

Commanders
Colonel Adolph von Steinwehr

See also
List of New York Civil War regiments

Notes

References
The Civil War Archive

External links
New York State Military Museum and Veterans Research Center - Civil War - 29th Infantry Regiment History, photographs, table of battles and casualties, and historical sketch for the 29th New York Infantry Regiment.

Infantry 029
1861 establishments in New York (state)
Military units and formations established in 1861
Military units and formations disestablished in 1865